This list contains all locomotive depots belonging to the Deutsche Bahn (DB) in Germany today (as at 2006). The official DB term for these depots is Betriebshof (plural Betriebshöfe) – formerly Bahnbetriebswerke.

See also 
 Deutsche Bahn
 List of locomotive depots in Germany

Sources 
Jan Reiners: So funktioniert das Bahnbetriebswerk. Transpress Verlag, Stuttgart 2006, page 35

Deutsche Bahn depots
Deutsche Bahn